Cozzo Busonè is a hill located in Raffadali, Agrigento, inside which were found the , two female statuettes of the Copper Age, now on display at the . It was also the oldest human settlement of Raffadali and a necropolis.

There are a number of Arab legends related to this hill, including one stipulating that every seven and a half years, in full moon nights of the hill is open, revealing a treasure inside. This legend has also dedicated a song.

The hill has oven tombs and two chamber tombs with stone and ceramic objects from the Chalcolithic period; archaeological excavations in them from 1967 onwards revealed the Venus figurines of Busonè.

Footnotes

Raffadali
Geography of Sicily
Archaeological sites in the province of Agrigento